Congoharpax judithae is a species of praying mantis in the family Galinthiadidae.

See also
List of mantis genera and species

References

Galinthiadidae
Insects described in 1972